Nicholas Siega (born 25 February 1991) is an Italian professional football player who plays for  club Südtirol.

Club career
He made his professional debut in the Lega Pro for Pro Patria on 1 September 2013 in a game against Cremonese.

On 15 July 2019, he signed with Pisa.

On 29 July 2022, Siega signed a two-year deal with Südtirol.

References

External links
 

1991 births
People from Novara
Footballers from Piedmont
Living people
Italian footballers
Vigevano Calcio players
Casale F.B.C. players
Aurora Pro Patria 1919 players
A.C. Reggiana 1919 players
L.R. Vicenza players
A.S. Cittadella players
Pisa S.C. players
F.C. Südtirol players
Serie B players
Serie C players
Serie D players
Association football forwards
Sportspeople from the Province of Novara